Dark Endless is the debut studio album by Swedish black metal band Marduk. It was recorded and mixed at Hellspawn Studios during four days in June 1992 and released that December by No Fashion Records. Like many early black metal albums, it mixes black metal vocals with predominantly death metal stylings. Dark Endless is the only Marduk studio album to feature Andreas Axelsson on vocals and Rikard Kalm on bass, as by Marduk's second album Those of the Unlight, they had been replaced by Joakim Göthberg (who plays drums on this release, along with contributing some vocals) and B. War respectively.

There also exists a Christian unblack metal band named "Dark Endless" who are named after this particular album.

Track listing 

The album intro and "Still Fucking Dead (Here's No Peace)", which were initially one track, were divided into two for the Regain Records reissue of the album. The songs are listed in the reissued track listing as "The Eye of Funeral" and "Still Fucking Dead" (dropping "Here's No Peace" from the title). This is why bonus tracks on the disc start at track 10 instead of track 9.

Re-issue 
The album was re-released with bonus tracks in digipak format on 4 April 2006.

Personnel

Marduk
 Andreas Axelsson – vocals
 Morgan Steinmeyer Håkansson – guitar
 Magnus "Devo" Andersson – guitar
 Rikard Kalm – bass guitar
 Joakim Göthberg – drums, vocals

Production
 Dan Swanö – mixing

References 

1992 debut albums
Marduk (band) albums